The Awakari River is a river in the West Coast district of the South Island of New Zealand. It is a tributary of the Waitakere / Nile River.

See also
List of rivers of New Zealand

References
Land Information New Zealand - Search for Place Names

Rivers of the West Coast, New Zealand
Rivers of New Zealand
Buller District